The RBC Taylor Prize (2000–2020), formerly known as the Charles Taylor Prize, is a Canadian literary award, presented by the Charles Taylor Foundation to the best Canadian work of literary non-fiction. It is named for Charles P. B. Taylor, a noted Canadian historian and writer. The 2020 prize will be the final year after which the prize will be concluded. The prize was inaugurated in 2000, and was presented biennially until 2004. At the 2004 awards ceremony, it was announced that the Charles Taylor Prize would become an annual award. The award has a monetary value of $30,000.

The award adopted its present name in December 2013, when RBC Wealth Management was announced as the new corporate sponsor. In addition, under RBC's sponsorship the award added a second $10,000 award for an emerging Canadian literary non-fiction writer between the ages of 18 and 35, to be chosen by the winner of the main award. This award was presented for the first time at the 2014 ceremony.

In 2018 the new RBC Taylor Prize Emerging Writers Mentorship Program was unveiled. This is a professional development program designed to support the next generation of Canadian writers and is part of the RBC Taylor Prize Emerging Writers Award, a distinction that is given annually to a Canadian author whose work embodies the pursuit of excellence in literary non-fiction.

The mentorship program is being made available to five Canadian non-fiction writers, who are selected in partnership with a national network of university and college writing programs. These students have been paired with the 2018 RBC Taylor Prize shortlisted authors, who will help support their career development and growth.

The organizers have announced that the 2020 announcement will be the final presentation of the award.

Winners and nominees

RBC Taylor Emerging Writer Award
The RBC Taylor Emerging Writer Award was instituted for the first time in 2014. The award is presented to an emerging writer selected by the winner of that year's primary award, and consists of $10,000 and a mentorship from the writer who made the selection.

In 2018, the RBC Taylor Foundation also announced the creation of a mentorship program for writers who have not yet published their first non-fiction manuscript. Five writers will be selected for the mentorship each year, each receiving mentorship from one of the shortlisted main prize authors.

2014 - Leanne Betasamosake Simpson
2015 - Iain Reid
2016 - Adnan Khan
2017 - Cassi Smith
2018 - Alicia Elliott
2019 - Jessica J. Lee
2020 - Simone Dalton

References

External links
 RBC Taylor Prize

Canadian non-fiction literary awards
Awards established in 2000
Awards disestablished in 2020
2000 establishments in Canada
2020 disestablishments in Canada
English-language literary awards